Wigmar Ingers Edvart Pedersen (born 9 October 1946) is a Danish middle-distance runner. He competed in the men's 3000 metres steeplechase at the 1972 Summer Olympics.

References

1946 births
Living people
Athletes (track and field) at the 1972 Summer Olympics
Danish male middle-distance runners
Danish male steeplechase runners
Olympic athletes of Denmark
Place of birth missing (living people)
20th-century Danish people